3362 Khufu is a near-Earth asteroid. It was discovered by R. Scott Dunbar and Maria A. Barucci at the Palomar Observatory in San Diego County, California, on 30 August 1984. Its provisional designation was 1984 QA. It is named after Khufu, an ancient Egyptian pharaoh. Khufu was the 4th Aten asteroid to be numbered.

3362 Khufu is a potentially hazardous asteroid (PHA) because its minimum orbit intersection distance (MOID) is less than 0.05 AU and its diameter is greater than 150 meters. Its orbit is well-determined for the next several hundred years.

Khufu crosses the orbits of Mars, Earth, and Venus and makes close approaches to Mercury as well. From 1900 to 2100 it drew nearer than 30 Gm (0.2 AU) to Mercury 26, Venus 27, Earth 20, and Mars 11 times.

Orbit

See also
 Venus-crosser asteroid
 Mars-crosser asteroid

References

External links 
 calculations by SOLEX 
 
 
 

003362
Discoveries by R. Scott Dunbar
Discoveries by Maria A. Barucci
Named minor planets
3362 Khufu
003362
19840830